Kinlough is a large village in north County Leitrim. It lies between the Dartry Mountains and the Atlantic Ocean, and between the River Duff and the River Drowes, at the head of Lough Melvin. It borders counties Donegal and Fermanagh and is near Yeats Country. It lies 2.5 miles from Bundoran, County Donegal, and across Lough Melvin from Garrison, County Fermanagh.

Amenities
The village has a library, pre-school, montessori school, after school care, primary school, community pitch, community hall and folk museum, a Church of Ireland and a Catholic church, pubs, restaurants and take-aways.

Demographics
The village population stood at approximately 350 since the Great Hunger.  Back in 1925, Kinlough village comprised 44 houses with 5 being licensed to sell alcohol. The 2006 census showed an increase for the first time in one hundred and fifty years. The 2011 census figures showed the population at 1,018, an increase of 47% on 2006.

Tourist attractions 

Lough Melvin (Irish: Lough Meilbhe) is internationally renowned for its unique range of plants and animals. As well as its early run of Atlantic Salmon, the lake boasts three trout species including the legendary Giolla Rua.  The first salmon of the year is caught regularly on the River Drowes which runs from the lake. Within the catchment area, the endangered globeflower, molinia meadows and sessile oak woodlands can be found. Lough Melvin straddles the border with part of it in Garrison, Co. Fermanagh.
The view from the village looks up to The Dartry Mountain often mistakenly referred to as 'Aroo Mountain' probably because Aroo Lough is situated on the south side of the mountain. Ahanlish, Glenade and Truskmore Mountains are also visible.

Nearby at Glenade (about 7.5 miles south east) is Poll na mBear (Cave of the Bears) where some of the best preserved examples of Irish brown bear bones were recovered by cavers in May 1997.

Education
The Four Masters School, is the village primary school. It is named after the Annals of the Four Masters, historical writings produced by Irish historians of the early 17th century.

Transport
Kinlough is served by two Bus Éireann routes on Fridays for Route 483 to Sligo and route 495 to Manorhamilton. Both routes also provide a link between Kinlough, Bundoran and Ballyshannon.

People
 Arthur Kerr (1877–1942), botanist, born Kinlough.
 James Kilfedder (1928–1995) was a Northern Ireland unionist politician.

References

Primary references

Secondary references

Towns and villages in County Leitrim